The 2012 Division 1, part of the 2012 Swedish football season, was the 7th season of Sweden's third-tier football league in its current format. The 2012 fixtures were released on 12 December 2011. The season began on 15 April 2012 and ended on 28 October 2012.

Teams
A total of 28 teams contested the league divided into two division, Norra and Södra. 20 returning from the 2011 season, two relegated from Superettan and six promoted from Division 2. The champion of each division qualified directly for promotion to Superettan, the two runners-up has to play a play-off against the thirteenth and fourteenth team from Superettan to decide who plays in Superettan 2013. The bottom three teams in each division qualified directly for relegation to Division 2.

Stadia and locations

Norra

Södra

 1 Correct as of end of 2011 season

League tables

Norra

Södra

Positions by round

Norra

Note: Some matches were played out of phase with the corresponding round, positions were corrected in hindsight.

Södra

Results

Norra

Södra

Season statistics

Norra top scorers

Södra top scorers

Young Player Teams of the Year

At the end of each Division 1 season an all-star game is played called "Morgondagens Stjärnor" (English: "The Stars Of Tomorrow"). The two teams playing against each other consist of the best young players from each of the two leagues.

See also

Competitions
 2012 Allsvenskan
 2012 Superettan
 2012 Supercupen

Transfers
 List of Swedish football transfers winter 2011–2012
 List of Swedish football transfers summer 2012

References

Swedish Football Division 1 seasons
3
Sweden
Sweden